"Put it Down" is the first single from Redman's sixth album, Red Gone Wild. Producer Timbaland produced and created the upbeat track used in "Put it Down". This song is unlike the traditional Redman song, in which the beat is slow and funky. "Put it Down" differs because it is completely different, being upbeat, and bass-pounding. The video features Timbaland. "Put it Down" also features additional vocals by DJ Kool.

The song was written by Redman and Timbaland

The video premiered on March 29, 2007 on Yahoo music.

Single track list

A-Side
 Put It Down (Dirty)
 Put It Down (Clean)

B-Side
 Gimme One (Clean)
 Gimme One (Dirty)

Chart positions

References

2006 songs
2007 singles
Redman (rapper) songs
Song recordings produced by Timbaland
Def Jam Recordings singles
Songs written by Redman (rapper)
Songs written by Timbaland
Music videos directed by Dale Resteghini